Phou Ningthou is a deity in Meitei mythology and religion (Sanamahism) of Ancient Kangleipak (Antique Manipur). He is the God and the divine male personification of the agriculture, crops, fertility, grains, harvesting, paddy, rice and wealth. He is the consort of Phouoibi (Phouleima), the goddess of crops and agricultural fertility.

Etymology 
In Meitei language (Manipuri language), "Phou" (ꯐꯧ, /pʰəu/) means "Paddy (unmilled rice)" (or "unhusked rice"). The Meitei term "Ningthou" (ꯅꯤꯡꯊꯧ, /niŋ.tʰəu/) literally means "the King" or "the Ruler".

Worship 
Phou Ningthou is worshipped with Phouoibi, the goddess of rice. Farmers prayed to the two deities for a doubling of the previous year's yield, after the harvest.

Phoukourol (Phoukouron or Phougourol or Phougouron) is a sacred hymn to call the spirit of the paddy. It is generally sung during harvesting. It is done before the harvested crops are stored in the grain house.

The Phou Kouba (calling the paddy/rice) ceremony is usually performed during mis-happenings to the farmers. Mis-happenings may be theft or burning of the paddy/rice, an animal like cow trespasses the threshing ground, etc. People perform the rites and rituals to induce the deity to stay at their places.

Sareng fish (Wallago attu, helicopter catfish) with rice is the most important offering to the deity. It should be cooked with herbs and not with spices.

References

External links 

Abundance gods
Agricultural gods
Arts gods
Crafts gods
Creator gods
Domestic and hearth gods
Earth gods
Fertility gods
Fire gods
Food gods
Food deities
Fortune gods
Harvest gods
Health gods
Kings in Meitei mythology
Life-death-rebirth gods
Maintenance gods
Meitei deities
Names of God in Sanamahism
Nature gods
Ningthou
Peace gods
Savior gods
Time and fate deities
Time and fate gods
Tutelary gods